Orientzomus is a genus of hubbardiid short-tailed whipscorpions, first described by Cokendolpher & Tsurusaki in 1994.

Species 
, the World Schizomida Catalog accepts the following three species:

 Orientzomus luzonicus (Hansen, 1905) – Philippines
 Orientzomus ralik Cokendolpher & Reddell, 2000 – Marshall Islands
 Orientzomus sawadai (Kishida, 1930) – Japan

References 

Schizomida genera